Harriet Dart and Ankita Raina were the defending champions, but Dart chose not to participate. Raina partnered alongside Akiko Omae, but they lost in the first round to Cao Siqi and Xun Fangying.

Beatrice Gumulya and You Xiaodi won the title, defeating Mai Minokoshi and Erika Sema in the final, 6–1, 7–5.

Seeds

Draw

Draw

References
Main Draw

Jin'an Open - Doubles
Jin'an Open